Yevgeny Vladimirovich Onopriyenko (born 14 March 1978) is a former professional association football player from Russia.

Club career
He played in the Russian Football National League for FC Salyut-Energia Belgorod in 2006.

References

External links
 Career summary by sportbox.ru
 

1978 births
Living people
Russian footballers
Association football midfielders
FC Salyut Belgorod players